Janet Patterson (12 August 1956 – 21 October 2016) was an Australian costume designer and production designer. She won one BAFTA award and four Australian Film Institute awards, and was nominated for four Academy awards.

Early life and education
Patterson attended North Sydney Girls High and later attended East Sydney Technical College and Sydney College of the Arts, receiving a Bachelor of Arts in Interior Design and a diploma in Textile Studies and Costume Design. In addition to her studies in Sydney, Patterson received a Winston Churchill Memorial Trust scholarship to study under architect Luigi Snozzi in Switzerland. She began her career in the 1980s working in production design, costume design, and set design for ABC Television.

Death
Patterson's death was announced by her agency, who had stated Patterson's family did not wish to disclose her age or date of death, however actress Nicole Kidman revealed she had died on 21 October 2016.

Awards

Oscar Nominations

All four were in Best Costumes

66th Academy Awards – Nominated for The Piano. Lost to The Age of Innocence.
69th Academy Awards – Nominated for The Portrait of a Lady. Lost to The English Patient.
70th Academy Awards – Nominated for Oscar and Lucinda. Lost to Titanic.
82nd Academy Awards – Nominated for Bright Star. Lost to The Young Victoria.

BAFTA Awards

Both are in costumes.

The Piano – Won
Bright Star – nominated.

Australian Film Institute

The Last Days of Chez Nous – nominated (production design)
The Piano – Won (costumes)
Oscar and Lucinda – Won (costumes)Bright Star – Won (for both costumes and production design)

Filmography

Costume DesignFar from the Madding Crowd (2015)Bright Star (2009)Peter Pan (2003)Holy Smoke! (1999)Oscar and Lucinda (1997)The Portrait of a Lady (1996)The Piano (1993)The Last Days of Chez Nous (1992)The Lizard King (1988)Two Friends (1986)Displaced Persons (1985)Palace of Dreams (1985)Sweet and Sour (1984)

Production DesignBright Star (2009)Holy Smoke! (1999)The Portrait of a Lady (1996)The Last Days of Chez Nous (1992)Come In Spinner (1990)Bodysurfer (1989)Edens Lost (1989)The Lizard King (1988)Two Friends (1986)Dancing Daze (1986)

Other
Set design for Four Corners'' in the mid-80s.

References

External links

1956 births
2016 deaths
Australian costume designers
Best Costume Design BAFTA Award winners
Women costume designers
Best Production Design AACTA Award winners
Women production designers
Australian production designers